Ministry of Internal Security, abbreviated KKDN, was a Malaysian federal government ministry.

History 
This ministry was established in March 2004 by  dividing the Home Ministry into two ministries, namely Ministry of Internal Security And Ministry of Home Affairs.

Ministry of Internal Security was led by the former Prime Minister of Malaysia, Tun Abdullah Ahmad Badawi and was supported by two Deputy Ministers. Secretary-General (Sec-Gen) KKDN who was aided by two Deputy Secretaries General (Sec-Gen), was responsible for five respective parts presided by a Secretary Part. On the other hand, each Secretary (Management) had eight parts under him/her. Three more departments were directly accountable to Sec-Gen.

Departmental structure 
This department had four departments / agency:
 Royal Malaysia Police (PDRM)
 National Anti-Drug Agency (AADK)
 Malaysian Prison Department
 Malaysian Civil Defence Department

On 18 March 2008, a new cabinet was announced and the Ministry of Internal Security was again incorporated into the  Ministry of Home Affairs.

External links
 kkdn.gov.my - Laman Rasmi KKDN

Former federal ministries, departments and agencies of Malaysia
Malaysia, Internal Security
Malaysia, Internal Security
Malaysia, Internal Security
Royal Malaysia Police